Co Adriaanse (born 21 July 1947) is a Dutch football manager and former player who played as a centre-back.

Playing career
As a professional player, Adriaanse played for six seasons with De Volewijckers (from 1964 until 1970) and a further six seasons with Utrecht (1970 until 1976), retiring from football at age 29.

Managerial career

Early career
Adriaanse began his managing career with Zilvermeeuwen in 1979, and after four years he joined AZ for the first time as scout and youth trainer. After a year, for the 1984–85 season he resumed his coaching career with two four-year stints with PEC Zwolle and FC Den Haag, where he would be sacked for the first time. He was then chosen to direct the youth side of Ajax, a position he would occupy for five seasons.

Willem II
In 1997, Adriaanse was appointed manager of Willem II. There, he implemented an – according to him – "compelling, aggressive style that can always be maintained". In his first season, the team finished in fifth place and booked impressive wins over Feyenoord (2–0) and defending champions PSV (4–1). The fifth place meant that the club qualified for European football for the first time since 1963.

In their run in the 1998–99 UEFA Cup, Willem II managed to knock out Dinamo Tbilisi in the first round 6–0 on aggregate, but lost to Real Betis in the second round. The club had a weak start to their domestic season, and held an 11th place in the league table at the winter break. A strong second half of the season, however, saw them finishing in second place after beating eventual champions Feyenoord 4–1, and Ajax 3–1. This meant that Willem II, a team better known for finishing in the bottom half of the Eredivisie, would be competing in the UEFA Champions League. The team, however, finished bottom of their 1999–2000 UEFA Champions League group stage, and after failing to achieve another European spot, Adriaanse resigned on 20 May 2000.

Ajax
Adriaanse returned to Ajax as manager, but after a third place season he was released early in the next season, on 29 November 2001, after a string of poor results. During his tenure, he made a number of controversial statements to the press – he called chairman of PSV, Harry van Raaij, a "talking lampshade", and most famously said of Marco van Basten who was rumoured to join the Ajax staff at the time: "A good horse does not make a good jockey."

AZ
After beginning the 2002–03 season without a club, Adriaanse was signed to AZ in November 2002. A tenth-place finish in the first season was followed by a fifth-placed finish, which allowed the Alkmaar team to join the UEFA Cup in the 2004–05 season. There, the club upset Spanish side and top contenders Villarreal in the quarter-finals before being knocked out on away goals in the semi-finals by Sporting Clube de Portugal, in the final minute of extra time. In the Eredivisie, AZ also performed above expectations, finishing third after topping the league for a week at the end of the first half and spending most of the second in second place. Adriaanse again coined a number of colourful phrases while at AZ, the best known being "Scoreboard journalism", "Cheese viewers", "Woonerf football" and "Evening footballer".

Porto
After much speculation and his stated desire to leave the club (he was succeeded by Louis van Gaal), on 24 May 2005 Adriaanse was presented as the new manager of Portuguese club Porto (replacing José Couceiro), and became the fourth manager to sign for the Portuguese side since the departure of José Mourinho. In the first season as Porto coach, he achieved the "Dobradinha" for the first time since the departure of Mourinho, winning the Primeira Liga and the Taça de Portugal.

Metalurh Donetsk
On 9 August 2006, Adriaanse resigned as manager of Porto. Four months later, he became coach of Ukrainian club Metalurh Donetsk. On 17 May 2007, Adriaanse resigned as manager of Metalurh Donetsk with four games to play in the Ukrainian Premier League.

Al-Sadd Sports Club
On 27 August 2007, Adriaanse signed a one-year deal with Al-Sadd and resigned as coach on 28 January 2008.

Red Bull Salzburg

On 13 March 2008, Adriaanse signed a two-year deal with the Austrian champion Red Bull Salzburg and he left the club after the end of his contract on 30 June 2009.

Qatar Olympic team
On 12 January 2010, it was confirmed Adriaanse's appointment at the helm of the Qatar Olympic team. His Middle East stint, however, lasted only 14 months, as his contract was terminated by mutual consent in March 2011.

Twente
On 20 June 2011, Twente announced on their website to have appointed Adriaanse as new trainer in place of departing manager Michel Preud'homme. In his first official match with the club, Adriaanse won the Johan Cruyff Shield against former team Ajax. On 3 January 2012, Adriaanse, halfway through a one-season contract, was terminated by Twente.

In the 2014–15 season, Adriaanse acted as technical advisor at Utrecht. He also decided to leave the club at the end of the season when manager Rob Alflen announced his resignation.

Managerial style

Tactical approach
Adriaanse gained a lot of fame in the Netherlands after qualifying for the Champions League with a mediocre Willem II side. It was even more impressive, because Willem II often played attacking football, a style Adriaanse has adopted throughout his managerial career.

Training
Adriaanse is famous for his controversial training approach. At Willem II, he once ordered his whole squad to follow him by car, while they drove 13 km away from their training ground. At a remote spot, all players had to give their car keys to Adriaanse. Then he drove back to town, while the squad had to run in front of his car. Back at the training ground, the players got their car keys back. Since their cars were still parked far from the training ground, however, they all had to walk back another 13 km. At AZ Alkmaar, he once ordered the whole squad to search for Easter eggs during a training session. They looked for an hour until Adriaanse finally revealed there were no eggs hidden. Adriaanse already had these strange training methods at the start of his career, because when he was a youth trainer at Ajax, he sometimes ordered his players to lie on the ground. Then a teammate with football boots on would run over the bodies. Because of all these infamous incidents, Adriaanse has been referred to as "Psycho Co".

Honours

As a manager
Porto
Primeira Liga: 2005–06
Taça de Portugal: 2005–06

Red Bull Salzburg
Austrian Football Bundesliga: 2008–09

Twente
Johan Cruyff Shield: 2011

Individual
Rinus Michels Award: 2004
Primeira Liga's Manager of the Season: 2006

References

1947 births
Living people
Dutch football managers
Dutch footballers
Eredivisie players
Eerste Divisie players
AVV De Volewijckers players
FC Utrecht players
PEC Zwolle managers
Willem II (football club) managers
FC Red Bull Salzburg managers
FC Porto managers
AFC Ajax managers
AZ Alkmaar managers
FC Metalurh Donetsk managers
FC Twente managers
Footballers from Amsterdam
Eredivisie managers
Primeira Liga managers
Ukrainian Premier League managers
Al Sadd SC managers
Dutch expatriate football managers
Expatriate football managers in Portugal
Expatriate football managers in Qatar
Expatriate football managers in Austria
Expatriate football managers in Ukraine
Dutch expatriate sportspeople in Portugal
Dutch expatriate sportspeople in Qatar
Dutch expatriate sportspeople in Austria
Dutch expatriate sportspeople in Ukraine
Dutch association football commentators
Association football defenders
Rinus Michels Award winners